Major Gilbert Field Airport, also known as Madeline Island Airport,  is a town-owned public use airport located 2 miles (3 km) northeast of the central business district of La Pointe, Wisconsin, a town in Ashland County, Wisconsin, United States. It is named in honor of Major Gordon E. Gilbert, who served in the 554th Fighter-Bomber Squadron in WWII. The airport is included in the Federal Aviation Administration (FAA) National Plan of Integrated Airport Systems for 2021–2025, in which it is categorized as a basic general aviation facility.

Although most airports in the United States use the same three-letter location identifier for the FAA and International Air Transport Association (IATA), this airport is assigned 4R5 by the FAA but has no designation from the IATA.

Facilities and aircraft 
Major Gilbert Field Airport covers an area of 136 acres (55 ha) at an elevation of 648 feet (198 m) above mean sea level. It has one runway: 4/22 which is 3,000 by 75 feet (914 x 23 m) with an asphalt surface.

For the 12-month period ending August 23, 2022, the airport had 6,050 aircraft operations, an average of 17 per day: 99% general aviation and 1% air taxi.
In January 2023, there was 1 aircraft based at this airport: 1 single-engine.

See also
List of airports in Wisconsin

References

External links 
 Airport Diagram at town of La Pointe website
 Airport page at town of La Pointe website
 

Airports in Wisconsin
Buildings and structures in Ashland County, Wisconsin
Airports in Ashland County, Wisconsin